Madhur is a temple town located in Kasaragod district of Kerala, India.

Location
Madhur town is located to the East of Kasaragod at a distance of 8 kilometers.

Madhur Temple
Madhur Temple is one of the biggest temples of Kasaragod district.  Its peculiar spherical shape and the riverside location gives it a unique charm.  A large number of visitors come to see the temple from Karnataka and Tamil Nadu.

Image gallery

References

Suburbs of Kasaragod